Humboldt Municipal Airport may refer to:

Humboldt Municipal Airport (Iowa) in Humboldt, Iowa, United States (FAA: 0K7)
Humboldt Municipal Airport (Tennessee) in Humboldt, Tennessee, United States (FAA: M53)